Yieldshields is a small village in South Lanarkshire, located close to the town of Carluke.

References

Villages in South Lanarkshire